North Parramatta is a suburb of the City of Parramatta, in the state of New South Wales, Australia 24 kilometres north-west of the Sydney central business district in the local government area of the City of Parramatta.

History 

The Darug people had lived in the area for many generations, and regarded the area as a food bowl, rich in food from the river and forests. They called the area Baramada or Burramatta ('Parramatta') which means "the place where the eels lie down".

Heritage listings 
North Parramatta has a number of heritage-listed sites, including:
 28a Bourke Street: Lake Parramatta
Corner of O'Connell Street and Dunlop Street: Parramatta Correctional Centre
 Pennant Hills Road: St Patrick's Cemetery

The UrbanGrowth NSW Development Corporation is working on creating an aspirational place identity for the publicly owned and nationally listed Heritage Core. It will not have any residential developments, and the heritage buildings will be preserved with the help of repair and restoration work that will make them weatherproof and safe. The significant landmarks on the site which will be conserved include the Cumberland Hospital and the Norma Parker Centre.

Schools and recreation
North Parramatta is dominated by Lake Parramatta and The King's School, which together comprise almost 50% of the land area. Lake Parramatta is a 10-hectare reserve, based around a former reservoir. The catchment area for the lake is bounded by North Rocks Road, Pennant Hills Road and Hunts Creek. The entrance is from Lackey Street, North Parramatta. Lake Parramatta served as a recreational spot for locals who enjoyed swimming. It had been closed due to pollution, but was reopened in January 2015.

Schools in the suburb include:
 Burnside Public School
 Parramatta North Public School
Redeemer Baptist School – situated on a heritage-listed area – former site of Burnside Orphanage
 RIDBC Garfield Barwick School
 Tara Anglican School for Girls
 The King's School, Parramatta, the oldest independent school in Australia
 St. Monica's Primary School

Transport
The nearest train station to North Parramatta is Parramatta railway station. The 609 bus route, run by Hillsbus, is the local access to bus transport. It circles around from Prince Street, to Gloucester Avenue, past Lake Parramatta, onto Iron Street and then to the Parramatta Bus Interchange.

At the 2011 census, 21.9% of employed people travelled to work on public transport and 57.3% by car (either as driver or as passenger).

Demographics 

At the 2016 census, North Parramatta recorded a population of 13,248.  Of these: 
 Age distribution  North Parramatta has a slight over-representation of young adults when compared to the country as a whole.  This is most apparent in the range 25–34 years of age, who make up 20.4% of the suburb's population, significantly larger than the national average of 14.4%. North Parramatta residents' median age was 35 years, compared to the national median of 38. Children aged 0–14 years made up 17.7% of the population (national average is 18.7%) and people aged 65 years and over made up 11.0% of the population (national average is 15.8%).
 Ethnic diversity  About half (45.4%) of North Parramatta residents were born in Australia; the next most common countries of birth were India 7.8%, China 5.5%, Iran 3.5%, Philippines 2.5% and Lebanon 2.2%.  However, only 13.2% identify their ancestry as Australian, which is the largest group; the next most common self-identified ancestries were English 12.9%, Chinese 9.0%, Indian 7.9% and Irish 5.3%. Just under half (44.1%) of people only spoke English at home; other languages spoken at home included Mandarin 5.7%, Arabic 5.5%, Persian 3.4%, Cantonese 3.2% and Hindi 3.2%.
 Religion  The most common responses for religion were Catholic 23.7% and No Religion 21.4%.
 Income  The average weekly household income was $1,524, compared to the national average of $1,438.	
 Housing  Most private dwellings (59.1%) were flats, units or apartments.  Another 23.7% were separate houses, while 16.6% were semi-detached (mainly townhouses). The average household size was 2.5 people.

See also
 Burnside Homes North Parramatta
 Lake Parramatta, a recreational area and a swimming spot in the suburb

References

External links
 http://www.parracity.nsw.gov.au/
  [CC-By-SA]

Suburbs of Sydney
City of Parramatta
North Parramatta, New South Wales